Low-crotch pants, also known as drop-crotch pants, are a type of pants with the crotch of trousers designed to sag down loosely toward the knees. Low-crotch pants have been available in styles for both men and women but the skinny-legged, dropped-crotch types of jeans and pants rose to popularity in the 2010s.

Terminology 
A style of trousers with extra room in the crotch region.

History
A modernized reimagined version of harem pants and sirwal, designers were pegging the junction of seams that forms the crotch on stretch fabric pants, somewhere in the mid to upper-thigh range, featuring a tapered skinny leg fitting with extra slouch around the bottom and crotch area.

Styles

The skinny-legged, dropped-crotch trousers inspired by hip hop fashion, made their way towards mainstream street style, especially men's wear.

See also
Hammer pants
Harem pants

References

External links

Jeans by type
Trousers and shorts
Hip hop fashion
Street fashion
Casual wear
20th-century fashion
21st-century fashion